The phrase baptism by fire or baptism of fire is a Christian theological concept originating from the words of John the Baptist in Matthew 3:11.

It also has related meanings in military history and popular culture.

Christianity

The term baptism with fire originated from the words of John the Baptist in Matthew 3:11 (and the parallel passage in Luke 3:16).:

Many Christian writers, such as John Kitto, have noted that this could be taken as a hendiadys, the Spirit as fire, or as pointing out two distinct baptisms - one by the Spirit, one by fire. If two baptisms, then various meanings have been suggested for the second baptism, by fire - to purify each single individual who accept Jesus Christ as Lord and Savior to be the temple of the Holy Spirit, to cast out demons and to destroy the stronghold of the flesh by the Fire of God.

Of this expression, J. H. Thayer commented: "to overwhelm with fire (those who do not repent), i.e., to subject them to the terrible penalties of hell". W. E. Vine noted regarding the "fire" of this passage: "of the fire of Divine judgment upon the rejectors of Christ, Matt. 3:11 (where a distinction is to be made between the baptism of the Holy Spirit at Pentecost and the fire of Divine retribution)". Arndt and Gingrich speak of the "fire of divine Judgment Mt. 3:11; Lk. 3:16".

However, as J. W. McGarvey observed, the phrase "baptize you ... in the fire" also refers to the day of Pentecost, because there was a "baptism of fire" which appears as the tongue of fire on that day. Parted "tongues," which were mere "like as of fire ... sat upon" each of the apostles. Those brothers were "overwhelmed with the fire of The Holy Spirit" on that occasion.  Similarly, Matthew Henry comments that as "fire make[s] all it seizes like itself... so does the Spirit make the soul holy like itself."

Methodism (inclusive of the holiness movement)

In Methodism (inclusive of the holiness movement), baptism by fire is synonymous with the second work of grace: entire sanctification, which is also known as Baptism with the Holy Spirit.

Jabulani Sibanda, a theologian in the Wesleyan-Arminian tradition, says with regard to entire sanctification:

Pentecostalism

In Pentecostalism, baptism by fire is synonymous with Spirit baptism, which is accompanied by glossolalia (speaking in tongues).

The Church of Jesus Christ of Latter-Day Saints

The relation between the confirmation of the Holy Ghost and the baptism of fire is explained by David A. Bednar, a church apostle: "the Holy Ghost is a sanctifier who cleanses and burns dross and evil out of human souls as though by fire".

Military usage
In the military usage, a baptism by fire refers to a soldier's first time in battle. The Catholic Encyclopedia, and writers such as John Deedy, state that the term in a military sense entered the English language in 1822 as a translation of the French phrase baptême du feu. From military usage the term has extended into many other areas in relation to an initiation into a new role.

In popular culture
The phrase 'baptism of fire' has also entered into popular culture. An example is Brothers in Arms (song) by the Dire Straits, which covers the British involvement in the Falklands war:

See also
Baptism with the Holy Spirit

References

  
 .
 .
 .
 .

External links

 Baptism at etymonline.com (EtymologyOnLine)
 Luke 3:16 (New International Version) at BibleGateway.com

English phrases
Rites of passage
Fire in religion